The Great Myanmar, is a 2019 Burmese docu-fiction film starring Ye Aung, Nine Nine, Htike San Moss, Warso Moe Oo. In this film showed about the legends of Myanmar and the first 3D film in Myanmar. The film, produced by Niyyayana Production, premiered in Myanmar on August 15, 2019.

Cast
Htike San Moss as Shin Arahan
Ye Aung as Anawrahta
Nine Nine as Kyansittha
Warso Moe Oo as Manisanda
Myat Thu Thu
Ju Jue Kay

References

External links

2019 films
2010s Burmese-language films
Burmese documentary films
Films shot in Myanmar
Burmese drama films
Docudrama films